Mike Garvis is an American slalom canoeist who competed from the late 1970s to the mid-1980s. He won five medals at the ICF Canoe Slalom World Championships with a gold (C-2: 1981), a silver (C-2 team: 1983) and three bronzes (C-2 team: 1981, 1983, 1985).

References

American male canoeists
Living people
Year of birth missing (living people)
Medalists at the ICF Canoe Slalom World Championships